Atig is an urban locality (urban-type settlement) in Nizhneserginsky District of Sverdlovsk Oblast, Russia. Population:

References

Notes

Sources

Urban-type settlements in Sverdlovsk Oblast